Cool Jazz and Coconuts is a 1985 Icelandic drama film directed by Jakob Frímann Magnússon. It was entered into the 14th Moscow International Film Festival.

Cast
 Ragnhildur Gísladóttir as Svala
 Egill Ólafsson as Oddur
 Tinna Gunnlaugsdóttir as Helga
 Þórhallur Sigurðsson as Karl
 Rúrik Haraldsson as Björn - sýslumaður
 Tyrone Nicholas Troupe III as General Reeves
 Jón Tryggvason as Dr. W. Vísindamaður
 Júlíus Agnarsson as Gunnar - Þórðarson
 Flosi Ólafsson as Bjarki - Tryggvason
 Herdís Þorvaldsdóttir as Skólastýra
 Sigurveig Jónsdóttir as Lovísa Símamær

References

External links
 

1985 films
1985 drama films
1980s Icelandic-language films
Icelandic drama films